Carabus auronitens is a species of beetle in family Carabidae which was described by Johan Christian Fabricius in 1792.

Subspecies
Subspecies include:
Carabus auronitens auronitens Fabricius, 1792
Carabus auronitens costellatus Géhin, 1882
Carabus auronitens cupreonitens Chevrolat, 1861
Carabus auronitens escheri Palliardi, 1825
Carabus auronitens farinesi Dejean, 1826
Carabus auronitens festivus Dejean, 1826
Carabus auronitens intercostatus Gredler, 1854
Carabus auronitens kraussi Lapouge, 1898
Carabus auronitens montanus Géhin, 1882
Carabus auronitens punctatoauratus Germar, 1824

Description
The elytra and the head are shiny, with different colours: red golden, red green or more rarely blue. The prothorax is narrow at the base and reddish copper in colour. The colours are very variable from one specimen to another. Each elytron has a granular surface with three sturdy, dark longitudinal veins. The legs are black, except the femora, which are red. The antennae are also black but the first segments are red.

This species can be distinguished from Carabus auratus, a similar species, by its longitudinal veins and its antennae: Carabus auratus has green-gold veins and its first four antenna segments are red.

Distribution and habitat
This species is found in central Europe, eastern Europe and western Europe. It is absent from northern Europe as well as south of the Pyrenees in western Europe. This species lives in humid, cool deciduous forests and mixed forests, and also in unwooded areas at high elevations. In western Europe it is also found in plains.

Life cycle
Adults appear from May to September. The imago is mainly nocturnal and predates on smaller animals such as snails, worms or insects. Hatching occurs near the end of summer or the beginning of autumn. They then spend the winter under bark, in gaps in dead wood as well as in tree stubs and will be active the following year.

Gallery

References

External links

Natur in Nordrhein-Westfalens 
Les carabes de France 
INPN 

Beetles described in 1792
Beetles of Europe
auronitens
Taxa named by Johan Christian Fabricius